Alpiscorpius alpha is a species of scorpion which is indigenous to southern Switzerland and northern Italy, west of the river Adige in northern Italy. It is usually found in humid, mountainous areas, under stones, logs etc., but also in humid parts of buildings such as cellars.

References

External links 
 scorpion-files

Euscorpiidae
Animals described in 1950
Fauna of Italy
Fauna of Switzerland
Scorpions of Europe